Roskilde municipality is a municipality in Region Sjælland, 30 km west of Copenhagen on the island of Zealand (Sjælland) in east Denmark.

The biggest city is Roskilde, the municipality covers an area of 212 km², and it has a total population of around 90,000 (2022). Its current mayor is Tomas Breddam. He is a member of Socialdemokraterne.

Neighboring municipalities are Egedal to the northeast, Greve and Solrød to the southeast, Høje-Taastrup to the east, Køge to the south and Lejre to the west.  To the north-west is Roskilde Fjord.

Roskilde University is located in the municipality.

By January 1, 2007 the former Roskilde municipality was merged with Gundsø and Ramsø municipalities into the current one, as the result of Kommunalreformen ("The Municipal Reform" of 2007). The name of the new municipality is still "Roskilde Kommune". The town hall is situated in the city of Roskilde, at Køgevej 80.

It formerly belonged to Roskilde County.

Urban areas
The ten largest urban areas in the municipality are:

Economy
Companies with headquarters in Roskilde municipality
 DLF
 Argo
 Top-Toy A/S (Danish Division of MGA Entertainment)
 CRH Concrete (Danish division of CRH plc)
 Bankernes EDB Central
 Stryhn's
 Roskilde Forsyning
 DanÆg

Politics

Municipal council
Roskilde's municipal council consists of 31 members, elected every four years.

Below are the municipal councils elected since the Municipal Reform of 2007.

Government
Accident Investigation Board Denmark is headquartered in Roskilde in Roskilde Municipality.

References  

 Municipal statistics: NetBorger Kommunefakta, delivered from KMD aka Kommunedata (Municipal Data)
 Municipal mergers and neighbours: Eniro new municipalities map

External links 

 

 
Municipalities of Region Zealand
Municipalities of Denmark
Populated places established in 2007